Hazari Gonj Hamidia Fazil Madrasah is a madrasah in Char Fasson, Bhola District, Bangladesh. It offers BTIS (Bachelor of Theology and Islamic Studies) in majors and Dakhil (SSC) as well as Alim HSC. The madrasah is affiliated with the Islamic Arabic University.

History
Hazariganj Union of Char Fasson upazila of Bhola District was underdeveloped and neglected before independence. As a result, the educational institution was built with the help of local initiatives and government assistance as per the demand of the people here.

Buildings
The madrasah has two buildings, a two-storey administrative building and a 100-meter hallroom.

Faculty
The madrasah has humanities department in both Dakhil and Alim section.

See also
Paschim Jinnahgarh Nuria Alim Madrasah

References

Madrasas in Bangladesh
Educational institutions established in 1965
Char Fasson Upazila
Alia madrasas of Bangladesh
1965 establishments in East Pakistan